Kang Young-seo (born July 19, 1997 in Seoul, South Korea) is an alpine skier from South Korea. She competed for South Korea at the 2014 Winter Olympics in the alpine skiing events.

References

1997 births
Living people
Olympic alpine skiers of South Korea
Alpine skiers at the 2014 Winter Olympics
Alpine skiers at the 2018 Winter Olympics
Alpine skiers at the 2022 Winter Olympics
South Korean female alpine skiers
Sportspeople from Seoul
Asian Games medalists in alpine skiing
Asian Games bronze medalists for South Korea
Alpine skiers at the 2017 Asian Winter Games
Medalists at the 2017 Asian Winter Games
21st-century South Korean women